Christophe Jaquet (born 2 April 1976) is a Swiss footballer who plays for Fribourg at 1. Liga.

He did not play any match in 2007–08 season, since followed Neuchâtel Xamax promoted back to Swiss Super League. He played 171 games in Swiss top-division.

External links
 
 
 Profile at football.ch 

1976 births
Living people
Swiss men's footballers
Switzerland international footballers
Yverdon-Sport FC players
Servette FC players
Neuchâtel Xamax FCS players
Swiss Super League players
Association football defenders
FC Fribourg players